Donovan Williams is a Jamaican Labour Party politician has been MP for Kingston Central since 2020.

References 

Living people

Year of birth missing (living people)
Members of the House of Representatives of Jamaica

21st-century Jamaican politicians
Jamaica Labour Party politicians
Politicians from Kingston, Jamaica
Members of the 14th Parliament of Jamaica